Héctor A. Arroyo Rodríguez (born 30 May 1966) is a Puerto Rican boxer. He competed in the men's lightweight event at the 1988 Summer Olympics.

References

External links
 

1966 births
Living people
Puerto Rican male boxers
Olympic boxers of Puerto Rico
Boxers at the 1988 Summer Olympics
People from Morovis, Puerto Rico
Pan American Games medalists in boxing
Pan American Games bronze medalists for Puerto Rico
Boxers at the 1987 Pan American Games
Lightweight boxers
Medalists at the 1987 Pan American Games
20th-century Puerto Rican people